Mestersvig, also called Mesters Vig, is a military outpost located in Scoresby Land, on the southwestern shore of Davy Sound in King Christian X Land, NE Greenland. It has a 1,800 m gravel airstrip .

This airport is located near the Stauning Alps mountainous area.

History
From 1956 to 1963, Mestersvig was a zinc and lead mine.

Later Mestersvig used to be the only permanent station in the Northeast Greenland National Park but all of the 1986 population of 40 has been split up into the three newer Northeast Greenland National Park research stations (Danmarkshavn, Nord and Daneborg) except a permanent population of two people, although tourists visit the station occasionally.

In September 2015, as part of the newest defence agreement to increase the enforcement of sovereignty in Greenland, Mission Mestersvig was executed. The mission was to test the responsiveness of the military of Denmark and if the equipment could handle winter weather. HDMS Thetis, parts of the Guard Hussar Regiment, Hunter Corps and the Danish Frogman Corps all participated in the exercise.

See also
List of research stations in the Arctic
Nerlerit Inaat Airport
Stauning Alps

References

Research stations in Greenland